The 2006 Tulsa mayoral election was held on April 4, 2006 to elect the mayor of Tulsa, Oklahoma. Partisan primary elections were held on March 7, 2006.

Incumbent Republican Bill LaFortune ran for re-election. He was defeated in the general election by Democratic nominee Kathy Taylor, who became the second female mayor of Tulsa after Susan Savage.

, this was the last time a Democratic candidate won a citywide race in Tulsa.

Republican primary

Candidates 
 Brigitte Harper
 Bill LaFortune, incumbent mayor
 Christopher Medlock
 Randi Miller, Tulsa County commissioner

Endorsements

Results

Democratic primary

Candidates 
 James Alexander, Jr.
 Accountability Burns
 Prophet-Kelly Clark
 James Desmond, candidate for mayor in 1988
 Don McCorkell, former state representative
 Kathy Taylor, Oklahoma Secretary of Commerce, Tourism, and Workforce Development

Results

Independents

Candidates 
 Benford L. Faulk
 Paul C. Tay, candidate for mayor in 2002

General election

Results

References

Tulsa
Tulsa
2006